Andixius trifurcus, is a species of planthoppers belonging to the family Cixiidae. It is endemic to China.

Body length of male is 6.4–6.8mm and female is 7.9–8.2mm. Body yellowish brown. Antennae blackish brown. Eyes brown with faint yellow ocelli. A tan spot near claval fork absent. Trifurcated ventral margin of the periandrium.

References

External links

Insects described in 2018
Cixiidae